North Little Rock Municipal Airport  is a public use airport in Pulaski County, Arkansas, United States. It is owned by the City of North Little Rock and located four nautical miles (5 mi, 7 km) north of its central business district.

This airport is included in the FAA's National Plan of Integrated Airport Systems for 2011–2015, which categorized it as a general aviation reliever airport for Little Rock National Airport.

Although many U.S. airports use the same three-letter location identifier for the FAA and IATA, this airport is assigned ORK by the FAA but has no designation from the IATA (which assigned ORK to Cork Airport in Cork, Ireland).

Facilities and aircraft 
North Little Rock Municipal Airport covers an area of 621 acres (251 ha) at an elevation of 545 feet (166 m) above mean sea level. It has two runways: 5/23 is 5,002 by 75 feet (1,525 x 23 m) with a concrete surface and 17/35 is 3,019 by 75 feet (920 x 23 m) with an asphalt surface.

For the 12-month period ending August 31, 2008, the airport had 37,200 aircraft operations, an average of 101 per day: 97% general aviation, 3% air taxi, and <1% military. At that time there were 150 aircraft based at this airport: 78% single-engine, 13% multi-engine, 4% jet, 5% helicopter, and 1% ultralight.

The airport's fixed-base operators (FBOs) are Barrett Aviation and Air Charter Express.

References

External links 
 
 North Little Rock Municipal Airport at Arkansas Department of Aeronautics
 Airport page at City of North Little Rock website
 Aerial image as of March 2001 from USGS The National Map
 
 
 

Airports in Arkansas
Transportation in Pulaski County, Arkansas
Buildings and structures in North Little Rock, Arkansas